Kenilworth is a village in Cook County, Illinois, United States,  north of downtown Chicago. As of the 2020 census it had a population of 2,514. It is the newest of the nine suburban North Shore communities bordering Lake Michigan, and is one of those developed as a planned community. In 2018, Kenilworth was the eighth wealthiest community in the United States, and the wealthiest in the Midwestern United States.

History 
Kenilworth was founded in 1889 when Joseph Sears purchased 223.6 acres of land consisting of several farms between the Chicago and North Western Railroad and Lake Michigan for $150,300. Sears and several of his associates formed The Kenilworth Company to execute his suburban dream.

The company undertook all marketing activities. They publicized the community's many attractive features through brochures, maps, and newspaper ads, as well as direct personal sales. Prospects were provided transportation from the city and greeted with a reception. Visitors were also offered overnight accommodations. In 1891, Sears invited about 20 of his personal friends, prominent bankers and Chicago businessmen to a picnic luncheon on Kenilworth's lake shore. Lots were offered at $60 an acre; significantly above the $15 an acre for similarly located property nearby. Some laughed, but the property did sell within 12 months. This planned community attracted widespread attention and was visited by many noted architects attending the 1893 Columbian Exposition in Chicago.

On February 4, 1896, the village reached the required 300 residents and was incorporated. The elected board assumed municipal functions from Sears. The Kenilworth Company continued their sales activities until 1904, at which time Sears acquired the existing stock and became the sole owner of the remaining property.

The Kenilworth Company coordinated every aspect of this planned community to ensure the highest quality implementation and adherence to Joseph Sears’ vision. The village layout was designed to take advantage of the natural features and beauty of the land. To maintain the country atmosphere, the plan required large lots and setbacks, tree plantings along roadways, and generous park lands. Mr. Sears donated much of his own property to achieve this goal.

The church, schools, parks, clubs, and recreational areas were early additions to encourage a spirit of community. Noted architect Franklin Burnham joined The Kenilworth Company and designed the railroad station and the Kenilworth Union Church. Burnham also designed several homes for company members to display for potential residents.

Joseph Sears founded Kenilworth with four stipulations: "Large lots, high standards of construction, no alleys, and sales to Caucasians only."

The first African-American family to move to Kenilworth, the Calhouns, was met with resistance by many in the community, such as a cross burning in 1966 and racially charged vandalism, while others voiced shock over the offenses. Speaking of his friends and neighbors, Walter Calhoun, a young student and athlete at the time, recalls "They bent over backwards to make sure I was never left out." Four years after the shocking incident, two teenagers visited Harold Calhoun in his downtown office where they confessed  and apologized for the cross burning.

Geography 

Demographics
As of the 2020 census there were 2,514 people, 730 households, and 639 families residing in the village. The racial makeup of the village was 89.14% White, 0.40% African American, 0.24% Native American, 4.18% Asian, 0.60% from other races, and 5.45% from two or more races. Hispanic or Latino of any race were 4.10% of the population.

There were 730 households, out of which 105.21% had children under the age of 18 living with them, 80.27% were married couples living together, 4.11% had a female householder with no husband present, and 12.47% were non-families. 11.51% of all households were made up of individuals, and 6.44% had someone living alone who was 65 years of age or older. The average household size was 3.44 and the average family size was 3.23.

The village's age distribution consisted of 33.0% under the age of 18, 7.5% from 18 to 24, 11% from 25 to 44, 34.4% from 45 to 64, and 14.1% who were 65 years of age or older. The median age was 43.5 years. For every 100 females, there were 102.2 males. For every 100 females age 18 and over, there were 92.3 males.

The median income for a household in the village was $241,591, and the median income for a family was $250,001. Males had a median income of $250,001 versus $58,214 for females. The per capita income for the village was $105,512. About 2.7% of families and 3.4% of the population were below the poverty line, including 1.2% of those under age 18 and 1.8% of those age 65 or over.

Arts and culture

Notable places and organizations in Kenilworth include:
Kenilworth Fountain – In the middle of Kenilworth Avenue just east of the railroad tracks
The Kenilworth Beach – The public beach on Lake Michigan, which is divided into a sailing beach and a bathing beach
Pee Wee Field – Also known as "Sears Stadium" - Baseball field located on the west side of town where many little leaguers play
Townley Field – District-owned sports field behind the school where many sports are played including field hockey, soccer, lacrosse, football, and the school Field Day
The Ware Garden – Public courtyard on the east side where many residents walk their dogs
Mahoney Park – A small park on the south side of town, named after the farm that was there at the town's founding
Kenilworth Train Station – Train station on the Metra Line in between Indian Hill and Wilmette stations
Joseph Sears School – Public elementary and junior high school on Abbotsford Road (JK-8)
The Kenilworth Club – A frequented community house that hosts all sorts of events throughout the year
Kenilworth Historical Society – Preserve and present the history of the town
Kenilworth Union Church – A non-denominational Protestant church on Kenilworth Avenue
Church of the Holy Comforter – Episcopal Church across the street from Kenilworth Union
Hiram Baldwin House – A Prairie School house designed by Frank Lloyd Wright in 1905

Public services 
Kenilworth does not have its own fire department. The town contracts with the neighboring Winnetka fire department. For library services, the Kenilworth Public Library District contracts with the Wilmette Public Library District.  Kenilworth has its own police department, and 9-1-1 calls are handled by Glenview Public Safety Dispatch.

The Village of Kenilworth maintains a Public Works Department for maintenance of streets, trees, village-owned buildings, and traffic signals. Kenilworth is served by the Kenilworth Park District, which maintains parks and related facilities, and provides recreational programming.

Government

Education

Kenilworth has its own public school district, with its only school being Joseph Sears School, named after the founder of the village. The district is School District 38 in Cook County, and is the fifth most expensive K-8 district in the state of Illinois in per-student spending. The school, commonly known as Sears, runs from junior kindergarten through eighth grade, with about sixty students per grade.

Kenilworth is a part of New Trier Township High School District, which maintains campuses in the neighboring communities of Northfield (for freshmen) and Winnetka (for upperclassmen).

Notable people

 Frances Badger, painter and muralist, born in Kenilworth
 Debra Cafaro, Chairman of the Board and Chief Executive Officer of Ventas, an S&P 500 company; a minority owner of the Pittsburgh Penguins
 Julia Collins, 20-game Jeopardy! champion 
 Robert Dold, Former Republican United States Congressman from 10th District of Illinois
 Walker Evans, Depression era photographer
 Paul Harvey, radio news commentator.
 Christopher George Kennedy, son of Robert F. Kennedy and Ethel Kennedy, and former president of the Merchandise Mart
 Mark Kirk, Republican former United States Senator from Illinois
 George Washington Maher, historically significant Chicago area architect
 James McManus, poker player
 Charles H. Percy, late and former Republican United States Senator from Illinois
 Jude Reyes, billionaire, co-owner of Rosemont-based Reyes Holdings, Inc.
Liesel Pritzker Simmons, actress, millionaire, and philanthropist
 Bradley Roland Will, activist, videographer and journalist; born in Evanston, was raised in Kenilworth
 Terence H. Winkless, film director

References

External links 

 

Villages in Illinois
Villages in Cook County, Illinois
Chicago metropolitan area
Populated places established in 1889
1889 establishments in Illinois
Sundown towns in Illinois